Amir Hajiyev (17 May 1899 — 21 August 1972) was an Azerbaijani graphic artist, Honored Art Worker of the Azerbaijan SSR.

Biography
Amir Hajiyev was born on May 17, 1899 in Shusha. He began his creative work in Shusha in 1918 by creating posters and portraits. In 1923 A.Hajiyev started to study at Azerbaijan State Art School.

Since the second half of the 1920s, Amir Hajiyev had been making illustrations for magazines such as "The Woman of Azerbaijan (magazine)" and "The Trade Union", and had begun to create posters on cooperation and other topics. At the same time, he was engaged in teaching in Baku. The role of Amir Hajiyev in the formation of one of his students Kazim Kazimzade as a well-known artist is invaluable. Since that time, the artist had created illustrations of works by well-known writers. "Khavar" (Mehdi Huseyn) (1930), "Country of the Giants" (1932), "Layla and Majnun" (Fuzuli) (1953) "Mail Box" (Jalil Mammadguluzadeh) (1960) are examples of these works.

Illustrations of "Garaja Giz" by Suleyman Sani Akhundov (1924), "Rising" by Abulhasan Alakbarzadeh (1931), "Fountain of Girls" by Yusif Vazir Chamanzaminli (1934), "Molla Ibrahim-Khalil Kimyagar" by Mirza Fatali Akhundov (1938), "Haft Peykar" by Nizami Ganjavi, (1941), "Layla and Majnun" by Fuzuli (1953) are considered the best book illustrations by Hajiyev.

He started creating propaganda posters during the Great Patriotic War of 1941–1945. At the same time, Hajiyev provided sketches for a number of decoration and plot carpets and authored miniature series ("Azerbaijan", 1961; "Shusha", "Shamakhi", "Baku", 1964).

In 1943 the painter was awarded with the name of Honored Artist of Azerbaijan SSR. Since 1945 he was a member of the Communist Party of the Soviet Union.

Amir Hajiyev died on 21 August 1972 in Baku.

References

1899 births
1972 deaths
Soviet people
Azerbaijani painters
Honored Art Workers of the Azerbaijan SSR